Long-chain fatty acid transport protein 4 is a protein that in humans is encoded by the SLC27A4 gene. This membrane protein is also called FATP4 or ACSVL5 (very long chain fatty acyl-CoA synthetase 5). The purified protein shows enzyme activity (EC 6.2.1.3), esterifying long and very long chain fatty acids with Coenzyme A. It is debated whether it is also a fatty acid transporter at the plasma membrane.

See also 
 Solute carrier family

References

Further reading 

 
 
 
 
 
 

Solute carrier family